Reginald Sergile, commonly known as Conceited is an American battle rapper from Brooklyn, New York City best known for his recurring role on the MTV program Wild 'n Out.

Conceited has appeared on King of the Dot, Ultimate Rap League, and Don't Flop in the US, on Got Beef? in Australia, and on O-Zone Battles in Sweden. His battle against Dumbfoundead at KOTD's "Blackout 5" event in Toronto received more than 2.6 million views in less than six months, and was the second most viewed English language battle.

He also had his own sneakers show on MTV called Sneaker Wars, and co-hosted the 2018 YouTube revival of Singled Out alongside Justina Valentine.

In May 2022 he became co-presenter of the revived MTV show Yo! MTV Raps.

References

Rappers from Brooklyn
Television personalities from New York City
Living people
21st-century American rappers
African-American male rappers
21st-century American male musicians
21st-century African-American musicians
20th-century African-American musicians
Year of birth missing (living people)